Gowrishankar may refer to

Annapoorna Gowrishankar, a hotel chain
Jayaraman Gowrishankar, Indian medical microbiologist 
Gawrishankar Udayshankar, Indian politician